Six auxiliary routes of Arkansas Highway 7 currently exist. Four are spur routes, one is a business route, and one is a truck route. They are listed below in south-to-north order.

One former alternate route existed in Dallas County, replaced by Highway 128 in 1937.

El Dorado spur

The highway runs from US 167 Business north to AR 7.

Major intersections

Smackover business route

The route is known as Pershing Highway east of town, and W 7th Street west of town. AR 7B passes the Smackover Historic Commercial District on the National Register of Historic Places.

Major intersections

Hot Springs spur

The route is known as Gorge Road and is a former alignment of US 70B. It connects AR 7 to the current US 70B and provides access to Gulpha Gorge Recreational Area.

Major intersections

Russellville spur

The route runs along International Paper Road and Lock & Dam Road. AR 7S runs from the International Paper factory past Norristown Cemetery.

Major intersections

Russellville truck route

The route runs from an intersection with Highway 7 and Highway 326 as a two-lane road. It runs east along Bernice Avenue before turning along Knoxville Avenue north to E. Main St.

Major intersections

Marble Falls spur

The route runs to the former amusement park Dogpatch USA whose parking lot contains Marble Falls' post office.

Major intersections

Dallas County alternate route

The route ran between State Road 7 in Pine Grove and State Road 9 in Holly Springs in South Arkansas. It was supplanted by State Road 128 in 1937.

Major intersections

See also

References

 
 
 

007
Transportation in Union County, Arkansas
Transportation in Garland County, Arkansas
Transportation in Pope County, Arkansas
Transportation in Newton County, Arkansas
Transportation in Dallas County, Arkansas
007A
007A